Max Brand: The Man and His Work is a bibliography of works by American author Frederick Faust, who wrote under the pen name Max Brand.  The bibliography was compiled by Darrell C. Richardson.  It was published by Fantasy Publishing Company, Inc. in 1952 in an edition of 900 copies.  The book is enlarged from Richardson's previous The Fabulous Faust Fanzine.

References

1952 non-fiction books
American non-fiction books
Brand
Fantasy Publishing Company, Inc. books